Cash Guns Chaos DLX is an arcade-style action game for the PlayStation 3 system that was released via download in the PlayStation Store. The name was changed from Cash Carnage Chaos to Cash Guns Chaos DLX before launch. In October, 2006 it was announced that the game would be available as a downloadable "casual use" game for the PlayStation 3.  It was one of two games available for download on the date of the United States launch.

Gameplay
Cash Guns Chaos DLX is a fairly traditional shooting-style action game which concentrates far more heavily on action-oriented combat than strategy or character development. It is almost identical in style, gameplay, and overall execution to the arcade classic Smash TV.

The story of the game is that aliens, which learned the human civilization exclusively by watching 1970s and '80s TV shows, kidnapped the player and forced him to play through levels to entertain the aliens.

Reception
Cash Guns Chaos received poor reviews from critics. Alex Navarro of GameSpot gave the game a 4.7/10, criticizing the gameplay, level design and art style while calling it a "cheesy knockoff [of Smash TV] with an irritating sense of style." Jeremy Dunham of IGN was similarly negative towards the game, giving it a 4.1/10 and describing it as being "boring, predictable, unnecessarily frustrating, and above all else, repetitive."

References

External links
 Official Cash Guns Chaos website

2006 video games
Multidirectional shooters
PlayStation 3-only games
PlayStation Network games
Sony Interactive Entertainment games
PlayStation 3 games
Multiplayer and single-player video games
Video games developed in the United States